Rocket or The Rocket is the nickname of:
Rocket Watts (born 2000), American basketball player
Ronnie Baxter (born 1961), English darts player
Roger Clemens (born 1962), American baseball pitcher
Evan Dollard, American fitness sports competitor
Raghib Ismail (born 1969), former professional American football and Canadian football player
Rod Jensen (born 1979), Australian rugby league footballer
Rod Laver (born 1938), Australian tennis player
Rodney Morris (born 1970), pool player
Ricky Nattiel (born 1966), American National Football League player
Ronnie O'Sullivan (born 1975), English snooker player
Maurice Richard (1921–2000), Canadian ice hockey player
Hashim Ridha (born 1979), Iraqi former footballer
Ronny Rosenthal (born 1963), Israeli soccer player, a.k.a. "Rocket Ronny"
Robert Sovík (born 1991), Czech ice hockey player

See also
 Pocket Rocket (disambiguation) 
Rocco Baldelli (born 1981), American retired Major League Baseball player nicknamed "The Woonsocket Rocket"
Matt Bonner (born 1980), basketball player, the "Red Rocket"
Pavel Bure (born 1971), former ice hockey player, the "Russian Rocket"
Valeri Bure (born 1974), former ice hockey player (brother of Pavel), the "Russian Pocket Rocket"
Brian Gionta (born 1979), American National Hockey League player, "The Rochester Rocket"
Terry McDermott (speed skater) (born 1940), American retired speed skater and 1964 Olympic champion, the "Essexville Rocket"
Ryan Newman (born 1977), NASCAR driver who is referred to as "The Rocket Man"
Aleksandr Panov (footballer) (born 1975), Russian footballer nicknamed the "Kolpino rocket"
Henri Richard (born 1936), former ice hockey player (brother of Maurice), the "Pocket Rocket"
Song Dong-hwan (born 1980), South Korean ice hockey player, the "Korean Rocket"

Lists of people by nickname